is an imperially commissioned Japanese genealogical record. Thirty volumes in length, it was compiled under the order of Emperor Saga by his brother, the Imperial Prince Manta (万多親王, 788–830). Also by Fujiwara no Otsugu and Fujiwara no Sonohito et al. It was initially completed in 814, but underwent a revision to be recompleted in 815.

Contents

The record contains genealogical records for 1182 families. It categorizes these by their family roots:
 imperial ancestry: 335 families
 divine ancestry: 404 families; of which 246 were of direct heavenly descent, 128 were of heavenly cadet descent, and 30 of earthly divine descent.
 foreign: 326 families; of which, 163 were from China, 104 from Baekje, 41 from Goguryeo, 9 from Silla, and 9 from Gaya.
The above categories were further subcategories by their present region of registration.

A total of 117 are listed as uncategorized.

Scholars have noted that at least one family, the Yoshida family, is listed under "imperial ancestry" but was likely of foreign origin.

The three categories in Japanese are called Kōbetsu (Imperial Ancestry), shimbetsu (Divine Ancestry) and shiban (Foreign)

References

Bibliography
 
 
 Murayama, Izuru 1983 (23rd ed. 2005) Ōtomo no Tabito, Yamanoue no Okura: Yūshū to Kunō. Tokyo : Shintensha.

External links
 Shinsen Shōjiroku, an online edition

814
9th century in Japan
9th-century Japanese books
Genealogy publications
Heian-period books
Heian period in literature
Japanese family registers
Late Old Japanese texts